Giesinger is a German surname. Notable people with the surname include:

  (born 1947), Austrian politician
 Max Giesinger (born 1988), German singer-songwriter
 Stefanie Giesinger (born 1996), German model

German-language surnames